Sir John Stradling Thomas (10 June 1925 – 29 March 1991) was a Welsh Conservative Party politician. He was also a farmer, company director and broadcaster.

Biography
Thomas was educated at Rugby School and the University of London. He served as a councillor on Carmarthen Borough Council between 1961 and 1964.

Thomas contested the parliamentary constituency of Aberavon in 1964 and Cardiganshire in 1966. He was Member of Parliament for Monmouth from 1970 until he died in office in 1991. He held various ministerial posts during the Heath and Thatcher administrations, including government Whip, Lord Commissioner of the Treasury, Treasurer of HM Household and in the Welsh Office, the later as a result of the premature death of Michael Roberts MP in February 1983.

In his final years he lived at Dolphin Square in Pimlico, London.

Leslie Spriggs 

A heart attack suffered by Labour politician Leslie Spriggs in 1974 became the subject of an anecdote by MP Joe Ashton, illustrating the sometimes extreme lengths party whips would go to in cases of Division:

"I remember the famous case of Leslie Spriggs, the then-Member for St. Helens. We had a tied vote and he was brought to the House in an ambulance having suffered a severe heart attack. The two Whips went out to look in the ambulance and there was Leslie Spriggs laid there as though he was dead. I believe that John Stradling Thomas said to Joe Harper, 'How do we know that he is alive?' So he leaned forward, turned the knob on the heart machine, the green light went around, and he said, 'There, you've lost--it's 311.' That is an absolutely true story. It is the sort of nonsense that used to happen. No one believes it, but it is true."

References

Notes

Other sources
The Times Guide to the House of Commons, Times Newspapers Ltd, 1966, 1987 & 1992

External links 
 
 Sir John Stradling Thomas at parliament.uk

1925 births
1991 deaths
People educated at Rugby School
Alumni of the University of London
Conservative Party (UK) MPs for Welsh constituencies
Councillors in Wales
Knights Bachelor
UK MPs 1970–1974
UK MPs 1974
UK MPs 1974–1979
UK MPs 1979–1983
UK MPs 1983–1987
UK MPs 1987–1992
Treasurers of the Household
Monmouth, Wales